Tyumensky District  is an administrative district (raion), one of the twenty-two in Tyumen Oblast, Russia. Within the framework of municipal divisions, it is incorporated as Tyumensky Municipal District. It is located in the west of the oblast. Its administrative center is the city of Tyumen (which is not administratively a part of the district). Population: 107,175 (2010 Census);

Administrative and municipal status
Within the framework of administrative divisions, Tyumensky District is one of the twenty-two in the oblast. The city of Tyumen serves as its administrative center, despite being incorporated separately as an administrative unit with the status equal to that of the districts.

As a municipal division, the district is incorporated as Tyumensky Municipal District. The City of Tyumen is incorporated separately from the district as Tyumen Urban Okrug.

References

Notes

Sources

Districts of Tyumen Oblast
